Sweet Lies is a 1988 film from Island Pictures, directed by Nathalie Delon and starring Treat Williams as an insurance investigator in Paris who becomes the object of a bet made by three women, who start to fall for him. Its title track was performed by Robert Palmer.

Plot

Cast
 Treat Williams as David Carroll
 Joanna Pacuła as Joelle
 Julianne Phillips as Dixie
 Norbert Weisser as Bill
 Brendan Kelly as Nino Scrocco

External links

1988 films
1988 romantic comedy films
Films set in Paris
American romantic comedy films
Films scored by Trevor Jones
English-language French films
1980s American films